A springboard is used for diving and is a board that is itself a spring, i.e. a linear flex-spring, of the cantilever type.

Springboard may also refer to:

 SpringBoard, the standard application that manages the iPhone's home screen
 Springboard, security improvements included in Service Pack 2 for the Windows XP operating system
 Springboard, an aerial technique in professional wrestling when a wrestler using any of the ring ropes bounces upward
 SpringBoard, a pre-Advanced Placement program created by the American not-for-profit organization College Board
 Springboard (gymnastics), a platform set upon one or usually multiple springs used in artistic gymnastics
 Springboard Expansion Slot, a versatile expansion slot devised for Handspring's range of Palm OS PDAs
Springboard injunction, a form of court order preventing misuse of confidential information
 Springboard Press, an imprint of Grand Central Publishing